The End of the Game is a 1975 American short documentary film directed by Robin Lehman. It won an Oscar at the 48th Academy Awards in 1976 for Documentary Short Subject.

See also
 List of American films of 1975

References

External links

Robin Lehman’s Animal Life at Phoenix Learning Group (includes The End of the Game)

1975 films
1975 documentary films
1975 short films
1970s short documentary films
1975 independent films
American short documentary films
American independent films
Best Documentary Short Subject Academy Award winners
Films scored by Harry Manfredini
1970s English-language films
1970s American films